Rick Bennewitz (November 10, 1936 – January 9, 1999) was an American television soap opera director, best known for shooting location sequences for various soap operas. The last episode of Sunset Beach he directed was dedicated to his memory.

Positions held

Land of the Lost
 Director (September 18 - November 27, 1976)

Santa Barbara
 Director (September 28, 1984 - January 15, 1993)

Sunset Beach
 Director (January 6, 1997 - February 5, 1999)

Awards and nominations
Daytime Emmy Award
Win, 1991, Directing, Santa Barbara (shared with Peter Brinckerhoff, Michael Gliona, Rob Schiller, Jeanine Guarneri-Frons (wife of Brian Frons), Pamela Fryman, Robin Raphaelian)
Win, 1990, Directing, Santa Barbara

Emmy Award
Win, 1971, Directing, The Andersonville Trial

References

External links

American television directors
1936 births
1999 deaths